Dag, or variant forms, may refer to:

Arts and entertainment
 DAG (American TV series), 2000–2001
 Dag (Norwegian TV series), 2010–2015
 DAG (newspaper), a former free Dutch newspaper
 DAG (band), an American funk band 
 DAG (Yugoslav band), an acoustic rock band
 Demented Are Go, a Welsh band
 Dags (film), a 1998 Australian comedy film
 The Mountain (2012 film) (Turkish: 'Dağ'), a 2012 Turkish drama film

People
 Dag (name), including a list of people and fictional characters with the name
 Dag the Wise, a 4th-century Swedish king

Places
 Dág, Hungary
 Dąg, Poland
 Dag (lunar crater), on the Moon
 Dag, a crater on Callisto, a moon of Jupiter
 Dar al Gani, or DaG, a meteorite field in the Libyan Sahara

Science and technology
 Diacylglycerol or diglyceride, commonly used as food additives
 Directed acyclic graph, in computer science and mathematics
 Decagram, or 10 grams, an SI multiple of gram
 Database Availability Group, a feature of Microsoft Exchange Server

Other uses
 Dag (slang), an Australian affectionate insult
 DAG Ventures, an American venture capital firm 
 DAG Rīga, later FK VEF Rīga, a Latvian football club
 Dagbani language, ISO 639-3 language code dag
 Dalgety Bay railway station, Scotland, station code DAG
 Barstow-Daggett Airport, California, U.S., IATA code DAG
 Democratic Army of Greece, during the Greek Civil War 1946–1949
 Deputy Attorney General, a post in a national department of justice 
 Defense Acquisition Guide, a guidebook for military acquisition in the U.S.
 Dyck Advisory Group, a South African private military company
 German Salaried Employees' Union (Deutsche Angestellten-Gewerkschaft)

See also
 
 
 Dagr, the personification of day in Norse mythology
 Aquadag, a water-based colloidal graphite coating